Trillium tennesseense, the Tennessee trillium, is a species of flowering plant in the family Melanthiaceae. It is found exclusively within two counties in northeastern Tennessee. Due to its limited range, it is designated as a critically imperiled species. The State of Tennessee lists this species as endangered.

Trillium tennesseense is a member of T. subg. Sessilium, the sessile-flowered trilliums. It most resembles T. oostingii but the two species differ with respect to several features. In particular, T. tennesseense has filaments nearly equal in length to its ovary (vs. less than half the length), a shorter ovary (2–4 mm vs. 6–16 mm), and stigma lobes distinctly longer than the ovary (vs. equal to the ovary length). When the plant is in full bloom, the flower emits a smell reminiscent of old-fashioned shoe polish.

The name Trillium tennesseense E.E.Schill. & Floden is regarded by some as a synonym for Trillium lancifolium Raf..

References

External links
 Trilliums, Trilliums, Trilliums and other neat stuff in Tennessee and North Carolina — 2016-04-30

tennesseense
Endemic flora of the United States
Flora of the Eastern United States
Flora of Tennessee